Tapinopterus is a genus of beetles in the family Carabidae, containing the following species:

 Tapinopterus aenigmaticus Lohaj, Guiorguiev, Dubault & Lassalle, 2012
 Tapinopterus agonaderus (Chaudoir, 1850)
 Tapinopterus amani (Breit, 1933)
 Tapinopterus attemsi (Apfelbeck, 1904)
 Tapinopterus atticus (Apfelbeck, 1904)
 Tapinopterus balcanicus Ganglbauer, 1891
 Tapinopterus bartonii Maran, 1933
 Tapinopterus bischoffi G.Muller, 1936
 Tapinopterus chaudoiri Lohaj, Guiorguiev, Dubault & Lassalle, 2012
 Tapinopterus comita Jedlicka, 1935
 Tapinopterus creticus (I.Frivaldszky Von Frivald, 1845)
 Tapinopterus detonii Schatzmayr, 1943
 Tapinopterus diadochos (Lutshnik, 1915)
 Tapinopterus dipojranus Straneo, 1986
 Tapinopterus dochii (Apfelbeck, 1906)
 Tapinopterus duponchelii (Dejean, 1831)
 Tapinopterus extensus (Dejean, 1831)
 Tapinopterus fairmairei (Chaudoir, 1868)
 Tapinopterus filigranus (L.Miller, 1862)
 Tapinopterus ganglbaueri (Tschitscherine, 1897)
 Tapinopterus ganglbauerianus (Lutshnik, 1915)
 Tapinopterus heinzi Straneo, 1983
 Tapinopterus heyrovskyi Jedlicka, 1939
 Tapinopterus imperialis Reitter, 1886
 Tapinopterus insulicola (Tschitscherine, 1900)
 Tapinopterus jaechi Kirschenhofer, 1991
 Tapinopterus jedlickai (Maran, 1932)
 Tapinopterus kapparicola Ganglbauer, 1889
 Tapinopterus kaufmanni Ganglbauer, 1896
 Tapinopterus kerberos Kirschenhofer, 1997
 Tapinopterus kuntzeni G.Muller, 1932
 Tapinopterus kyparissis (Jedlicka, 1963)
 Tapinopterus laevisternus G.Muller, 1932
 Tapinopterus laticornis (Fairmaire, 1856)
 Tapinopterus macedonicus Curcic, Waitzbauer, Zolda, Curcic & Mihajlova, 2008
 Tapinopterus machardi (Jeanne, 2005)
 Tapinopterus marani V. & B.Gueorguiev, 1999
 Tapinopterus meschniggi (Schatzmayr, 1928)
 Tapinopterus minax (Tschitscherine, 1900)
 Tapinopterus miridita (Apfelbeck, 1904)
 Tapinopterus molopinus (Chaudoir, 1868)
 Tapinopterus monastirensis Reitter, 1913
 Tapinopterus moreoticus Maran, 1937
 Tapinopterus obenbergeri (Maran, 1932)
 Tapinopterus oyukluensis Lohaj, Guiorguiev, Dubault & Lassalle, 2012
 Tapinopterus persicus (Chaudoir, 1878)
 Tapinopterus phrygius G.Muller, 1932
 Tapinopterus placidus (Rosenhauer, 1847)
 Tapinopterus protensus (Schaum, 1857)
 Tapinopterus punctatus (L.Redtenbacher, 1843)
 Tapinopterus purkynei Jedlicka, 1928
 Tapinopterus rambousekianus Maran, 1933
 Tapinopterus rebellis (Reiche & Saulcy, 1855)
 Tapinopterus relegatus Lohaj, Guiorguiev, Dubault & Lassalle, 2012
 Tapinopterus samai Straneo, 1986
 Tapinopterus stepaneki Maran, 1934
 Tapinopterus susterai (Maran, 1943)
 Tapinopterus toelgi (Breit, 1933)
 Tapinopterus weiratheri G.Muller, 1932
 Tapinopterus zygosensis Maran, 1939

References

Pterostichinae